Chetan Sharma  (born 3 January 1966) is a retired Indian cricket player who played Tests and ODIs as a fast bowler for Indian cricket team. 

After retirement he appeared as a cricket pundit at multiple Indian tv news networks. On 24 December 2020, he was selected as Chairman of the selection committee of Indian cricket team.

In November 2022, he was sacked from the position of BCCI national chief selector after team India's exit from the 2022 T20 World Cup. Later BCCI re-appointed him.

Domestic career
He made his first class debut for Punjab at the age of 17 and appeared in One Day Internationals a year later. He was the first man to take a hat-trick in ODI world cup. He achieved this feat in 1987 Reliance World Cup against New Zealand.

International career

Making his first appearance in Tests against Pakistan at Lahore in 1984, he bowled Mohsin Khan with his fifth ball – becoming the third Indian to take a wicket in his first over in Test cricket. He took fourteen wickets in the three Tests in Sri Lanka in 1985. Later that season  in Australia, with India needing a win in the last match of the league to qualify for the final of the World Series Cup.

Sharma was an important member of the Indian team that defeated England 2–0 in 1986. He took sixteen wickets in the two Tests that he played. He took 10 wickets at Birmingham, including a career best 6 for 58 in the second innings. It remains the only 10 wicket haul by an Indian in England. He also is one of the few Indian pacers, like his mentor Kapil Dev, to take a 5 wicket haul in his 32 over spell to end with 5-64 and also have his name permanently etched in the Hall of Fame board at Lord's Cricket Ground. Though only twenty at this time, he picked up frequent injuries which restricted his career. When available, he was the first choice as the opening bowler with Kapil Dev for the next three years.

For his ability to get useful runs down the order that too at quick rate, Chetan was seen as a natural successor to Kapil Dev in the all-rounder category. By the early nineties, his bowling dropped in pace and its sharpness and his strike rate had dropped considerably.

1987 World Cup
In the Reliance World Cup in 1987, Sharma took the first hat-trick in the history of tournament when he clean bowled Ken Rutherford, Ian Smith and Ewen Chatfield of New Zealand off consecutive balls.

Post World Cup
He played the most noted innings of his career against England in the Nehru Cup in 1989. Sent in at No.3 with India facing a target of 256, he scored a 101* in 96 balls, completing his hundred with the match-winning run. He made another important contribution in India's win against Australia in the next match, sharing an unfinished partnership of 40 runs with Manoj Prabhakar and ending the match with a six. But his bowling had waned considerably and he was excluded from the tour of Pakistan a few weeks later.

Late career
Sharma received few opportunities thereafter. In one of his last international appearances, against New Zealand in a three nations tournament in 1994 he ended up with figures of 1–0–23–0 after being hit for five fours off consecutive balls by Stephen Fleming. He moved from Haryana to Bengal in 1993 and stayed there till the end of his career in 1996.

Sharma is also infamously remembered for bowling the last over in the final of the Austral-Asia cup in Sharjah in 1986. With Pakistan needing four runs off the last ball to win, he bowled a low full toss outside the leg stump, which was hit for six by Javed Miandad. That defeat started a chain of defeats for Indian cricket team in Sharjah.

After cricket
After his retirement, Chetan became a cricket commentator. He opened a Fast bowling cricket academy in Panchkula in Haryana in 2004 which closed down in 2009. Chetan is the nephew of the former Indian cricketer Yashpal Sharma.

Political career

Chetan contested the Lok Sabha (2009) polls from Faridabad on a Bahujan Samaj Party (BSP) ticket. He came 3rd polling 18.2 percent votes. He subsequently joined the Bharatiya Janta Party (BJP), and was appointed party's sports cell convener.

As Chief selector

In December 2020, he was elected as Chairman of the selection committee of Indian cricket team. Later in November 2022, he was sacked from the position after team India's exit from the Cricket World Cup. However, he was re-appointed on the same post upon applying for it.

Controversy and resignation
In February 2023, he courted controversy when he got filmed in a sting operation which alleged that Indian cricketers take injections to expedite their return to the national team, despite being only 80 to 85 % fit; he also revealed that Virat Kohli lied to media in 2021 that BCCI removed him from ODI captaincy without discussing to defame then BCCI president Sourav Ganguly. He resigned from the post of chief selector a few days after the release of sting operation.

References

 
 Christopher Martin-Jenkins, The Complete Who's Who of Test Cricketers

1966 births
Living people
India One Day International cricketers
One Day International hat-trick takers
Cricketers at the 1987 Cricket World Cup
India Test cricketers
Indian cricketers
North Zone cricketers
East Zone cricketers
Bengal cricketers
Haryana cricketers
Cricketers from Ludhiana
Indian cricket coaches
Victoria Sporting Club cricketers
Indian cricket commentators
M Parkinson's World XI cricketers